László Kovácsi (born: 12 April 1958) is a sailor from Budapest, Hungary. who represented his country at the 1996 Summer Olympics in Savannah, United States as crew member in the Soling. With helmsman György Wossala and fellow crew member Károly Vezér they took the 20th place.

References

Living people
1958 births
Sailors at the 1996 Summer Olympics – Soling
Olympic sailors of Hungary
Sportspeople from Budapest
Hungarian male sailors (sport)